Canada Life Centre (formerly the MTS Centre, then Bell MTS Place) in Winnipeg, Manitoba, Canada is one of the busiest venues in North America since its opening in 2004. In 2008, its placed 19th busiest arena in the world and 11th in North America, with 385,427 tickets (not including sporting events) In 2009, it ranked as the 39th busiest arena in the world, and 26th busiest in North America.

The following is a list of concerts and other non-sport entertainment events that have taken place at Canada Life Centre.

2004 – 2010

2011 – 2020

References

External links
MTS Centre official website

Entertainment events at Bell MTS Place
Entertainment events in Canada
Events in Winnipeg
Entertainment
Entertainment events at Bell MTS Place
Canada Life
Events